The Age of Insects is a 1990 American psycho-horror comedy film directed by Eric Marciano (Marano), his first feature film, and co-written by him and Club 57 alumnus Andy Rees.

Influenced by B-movies and bad television shows from the 1950s and 1960s, and portraying the East Village of the early 1980s, it is an account of a mad doctor's hallucinogenic treatments for bad boys. It was filmed from 1983 to 1990 in New York City, pioneering a mix of Super 8, 16 mm, 35mm film, Hi8, 3/4" and BetaCam video formats.

The film stars Jack Ramey, Lisa Zane, K.C. Townshend, Louis Homyak, Dallas Munroe, Heather Woodbury, and David Ilku.

In 2007 a succinct and extensive story of how the film came to be was published in "Gods in Spandex: a Survivors' Account of 80's Cinema Obscura" by Suzanne Donahue and Mikael Sovijarvi (also the authors of Gods In Polyester: A Survivors' Account Of 70's Cinema Obscura).

Reviews

"Coupled with the extensive use of creepy-crawly insect footage and computerized sexual imagery, director Marciano's darkly comic vision is sublime fun."—David E. Williams, Film Threat, April 1992

"This movie is the Citizen Kane of underground films—intelligent, funny, engrossing."—Joe Bob Briggs, January 24, 1994

References

External links

1990 films
1990s comedy horror films
American comedy horror films
1990 comedy films
1990s American films